Ideocaira is a genus of African orb-weaver spiders first described by Eugène Simon in 1903.  it contains only two species, both found in South Africa.

References

Araneidae
Araneomorphae genera
Spiders of South Africa
Taxa named by Eugène Simon